Insular dwarfism, a form of phyletic dwarfism, is the process and condition of large animals evolving or having a reduced body size when their population's range is limited to a small environment, primarily islands. This natural process is distinct from the intentional creation of dwarf breeds, called dwarfing. This process has occurred many times throughout evolutionary history, with examples including dinosaurs, like Europasaurus and Magyarosaurus dacus, and modern animals such as elephants and their relatives. This process, and other "island genetics" artifacts, can occur not only on islands, but also in other situations where an ecosystem is isolated from external resources and breeding. This can include caves, desert oases, isolated valleys and isolated mountains ("sky islands"). Insular dwarfism is one aspect of the more general "island effect" or "Foster's rule", which posits that when mainland animals colonize islands, small species tend to evolve larger bodies (island gigantism), and large species tend to evolve smaller bodies. This is itself one aspect of island syndrome, which describes the differences in morphology, ecology, physiology and behaviour of insular species compared to their continental counterparts.

Possible causes
There are several proposed explanations for the mechanism which produces such dwarfism.

One is a selective process where only smaller animals trapped on the island survive, as food periodically declines to a borderline level. The smaller animals need fewer resources and smaller territories, and so are more likely to get past the break-point where population decline allows food sources to replenish enough for the survivors to flourish.  Smaller size is also advantageous from a reproductive standpoint, as it entails shorter gestation periods and generation times.

In the tropics, small size should make thermoregulation easier.

Among herbivores, large size confers advantages in coping with both competitors and predators, so a reduction or absence of either would facilitate dwarfing; competition appears to be the more important factor.

Among carnivores, the main factor is thought to be the size and availability of prey resources, and competition is believed to be less important. In tiger snakes, insular dwarfism occurs on islands where available prey is restricted to smaller sizes than are normally taken by mainland snakes. Since prey size preference in snakes is generally proportional to body size, small snakes may be better adapted to take small prey.

Dwarfism vs. gigantism
The inverse process, wherein small animals breeding on isolated islands lacking the predators of large land masses may become much larger than normal, is called island gigantism. An excellent example is the dodo, the ancestors of which were normal-sized pigeons.  There are also several species of giant rats, one still extant, that coexisted with both Homo floresiensis and the dwarf stegodonts on Flores.

The process of insular dwarfing can occur relatively rapidly by evolutionary standards. This is in contrast to increases in maximum body size, which are much more gradual. When normalized to generation length, the maximum rate of body mass decrease during insular dwarfing was found to be over 30 times greater than the maximum rate of body mass increase for a ten-fold change in mammals. The disparity is thought to reflect the fact that pedomorphism offers a relatively easy route to evolve smaller adult body size; on the other hand, the evolution of larger maximum body size is likely to be interrupted by the emergence of a series of constraints that must be overcome by evolutionary innovations before the process can continue.

Factors influencing the extent of dwarfing
For both herbivores and carnivores, island size, the degree of island isolation and the size of the ancestral continental species appear not to be of major direct importance to the degree of dwarfing. However, when considering only the body masses of recent top herbivores and carnivores, and including data from both continental and island land masses, the body masses of the largest species in a land mass were found to scale to the size of the land mass, with slopes of about 0.5 log(body mass/kg) per log(land area/km2). There were separate regression lines for endothermic top predators, ectothermic top predators, endothermic top herbivores and (on the basis of limited data) ectothermic top herbivores, such that food intake was 7 to 24-fold higher for top herbivores than for top predators, and about the same for endotherms and ectotherms of the same trophic level (this leads to ectotherms being 5 to 16 times heavier than corresponding endotherms).

Examples

Non-avian dinosaurs 
Recognition that insular dwarfism could apply to dinosaurs arose through the work of Ferenc Nopcsa, a Hungarian-born aristocrat, adventurer, scholar, and paleontologist. Nopcsa studied Transylvanian dinosaurs intensively, noticing that they were smaller than their cousins elsewhere in the world. For example, he unearthed six-meter-long sauropods, a group of dinosaurs which elsewhere commonly grew to 30 meters or more. Nopcsa deduced that the area where the remains were found was an island, Hațeg Island (now the Haţeg or Hatzeg basin in Romania) during the Mesozoic era. Nopcsa's proposal of dinosaur dwarfism on Hațeg Island is today widely accepted after further research confirmed that the remains found are not from juveniles.

Sauropods

Other 

In addition, the genus Balaur was initially described as a Velociraptor-sized dromaeosaurid (and in consequence a dubious example of insular dwarfism), but has been since reclassified as a secondarily flightless stem bird, closer to modern birds than Jeholornis (thus actually an example of insular gigantism).

Birds

Squamates

Mammals

Pilosans

Proboscideans

Primates

Carnivorans

Non-ruminant ungulates

Bovids

Cervids and relatives

Plants

See also

 Island gigantism
 Island tameness
 Pleistocene extinctions
 Island syndrome

Notes

References

External links
Strange world of island species October 31, 2004 The Observer 

Animal size
Evolutionary biology
Dwarfism